New York State Route 269 (NY 269) is a north–south state highway located in western New York in the United States. The highway runs for  along the Niagara–Orleans county line and is named County Line Road. The southern terminus of NY 269 is at an intersection with NY 104 in the hamlet of Jeddo. Its northern terminus is at a junction with NY 18 in the hamlet of County Line. NY 269 is one of only two state highways in New York that are located wholly along a county boundary; the other is NY 272 on the other side of Orleans County. The route was assigned as part of the 1930 renumbering of state highways in New York and has not been altered since.

Route description

NY 269 begins at an intersection with NY 104 (Ridge Road) in the hamlet of Jeddo, located on the boundary between the towns of Hartland, Niagara County, and Ridgeway, Orleans County. The highway progresses northward along the two-lane County Line Road, running along the eastern boundary of Niagara County and the western edge of Orleans County. Not far to the north of the hamlet is Town Line Road, which serves as the divider between the towns of Hartland and Somerset.

North of Town Line Road, NY 269 crosses into the towns of Somerset and Yates, where it initially continues across more rural terrain. Eventually, the route reaches the hamlet of County Line, a small but commercialized community located in an otherwise open and undeveloped area. NY 269 heads into the center of the community, where the NY 269 designation terminates at an intersection with NY 18 (Lake Road). NY 269 is one of only two state highways in New York that are located wholly along a county boundary. Incidentally, the other—NY 272—follows the northern half of Orleans County's eastern boundary, which it shares with Monroe County.

History
The portion of the Niagara–Orleans county line road between Ridge Road and the hamlet of County Line was taken over by the state of New York . In the 1930 renumbering of state highways in New York, several of the routes assigned during the 1920s were renumbered or modified. At the same time, hundreds of state-maintained highways that did not yet have a route number were assigned one. One of these was the state-maintained portion of the Niagara–Orleans county line road, which was designated as NY 269. The route has not been substantially altered since that time.

Major intersections
The entire route is located on the Niagara–Orleans county line.

See also

References

External links

269
Transportation in Niagara County, New York
Transportation in Orleans County, New York